Compressed Hare is a 1961 Merrie Melodies cartoon directed by Chuck Jones. The short was released on July 29, 1961, and stars Bugs Bunny and Wile E. Coyote. This is the final first-run Golden Age short in which Wile E. Coyote speaks, although he speaks again in the Adventures of the Road Runner featurette a year later.

Plot

Wile E. Coyote leaves a telephone in the hole of his neighbor Bugs Bunny. He calls from his cave, asking to borrow a cup of diced carrots. Bugs' whiskers twitch as he looks at the Coyote's mailbox and he realizes what he's up against. After Bugs mocks him, Wile E. grabs Bugs, ties him to a stake, and prepares to complete his rabbit stew, but Bugs gets the upper hand by hopping on the floorboards and setting off a wine cork that, after it ricochets around the room, triggers Wile E.'s Murphy bed to open, crushing the Coyote into the floor. Bugs makes his getaway and hops back to his hole.

Wile E. then tries using a vacuum cleaner to suck up the rabbit, getting a dynamite decoy instead (before the decoy explodes, he says, "Well, well, the boy has talent"), a cannon shot, which Bugs re-directs at the Coyote thanks to some underground pipes (Coyote: "But how? Well, even a genius can have an off-day"), and "Quick-Drying Cement".  The cement dries into a cylindrical block.  As Wile E. laughs, saying, "What a wonderful way to cement a friendship.", he runs right into the block, which tips over on top of him.  Bugs then pops out and says, "Well, now he has concrete evidence that I'm a good neighbor".

The final attempt is a 10 billion-volt electric magnet, which Wile E. activates after leaving an iron carrot in Bugs' hole. Bugs tricks him and sends the carrot right back at him. Bugs' mailbox is also pulled towards the magnet, hitting Wile E. in the face. To further batter the Coyote, Bugs throws out an iron, a frying pan, a garbage bin, and a mallet, as well as his bed and kitchen stove, all of which are attracted to the magnet.  However, neither Bugs nor Wile E. expect the magnet to also attract everything else with metal properties (including barbed wire, horse shoes, street lamps, kettles, cars, signs, bulldozers, iron fences, buses, an ocean liner, the Eiffel Tower, satellites, and, finally, a Mercury rocket trying to blast off into space). The Mercury rocket lodges itself in Wile E's cave and explodes, along with everything else the magnet attracted, blasting Wile E. Coyote into oblivion as Bugs watches from his hole. Bugs remarks jokingly: "One thing's for sure. We're the first country to get a coyote into orbit."

Additional Crew
Directed by Chuck Jones
Co-Director: Maurice Noble
Film Editor: Treg Brown

References

External links

 
 

1960s English-language films
1961 animated films
1961 short films
Merrie Melodies short films
American comedy short films
Short films directed by Chuck Jones
Bugs Bunny films
Wile E. Coyote and the Road Runner films
Films scored by Milt Franklyn
1960s Warner Bros. animated short films
American animated short films
Films about Canis
Animated films about rabbits and hares